USS Badger (DD–126) was a United States Navy  in commission from 1919 to 1922 and from 1930 to 1945. She saw service during World War II. She was named for Commodore Oscar C. Badger.

Construction and commissioning
Badger was launched on 24 August 1918 by the New York Shipbuilding Corporation at Camden, New Jersey, sponsored by Mrs. Henry F. Bryan, granddaughter of Commodore Badger. She was commissioned on 29 May 1919 with Commander Q. T. Swasey in command.

Service history

Pre-World War II
Following her commissioning, Badger reported to the United States Atlantic Fleet. She steamed to the Mediterranean, where she cruised until August 1919. Upon her return to the United States East Coast, she was assigned to the United States Pacific Fleet, arriving at San Diego, California, in September 1919. She served at various naval bases on the United States West Coast until May 1922, when she was decommissioned.

Upon recommissioning in January 1930, Badger served with the Battle Force and Scouting Force in the Pacific. In April 1933, she returned to the Atlantic and thereafter participated in coastal cruises and reserve training. From 1938 to 1939, she operated with Special Squadron 4 based at Villefranche-sur-Mer, France. Upon her return to Norfolk, Virginia, she joined Destroyer Division 53, Patrol Force, with additional summer assignments to the Midshipmen Coastal Cruise Detachment.

From March to April 1941, Badger was refitted to better equip her for escort duties. Her gun armament and two triple mounts of torpedo tubes were removed, replaced by six 3"/50 caliber dual-purpose guns. Two triple torpedo tube mounts were retained, and an improved anti-submarine armament of 24 depth charges was fitted.

World War II
The United States entered World War II on 7 December 1941. Between December 1941 and October 1944, Badger operated as a convoy escort in the Atlantic and Caribbean. Twice she escorted convoys to North Africa (15 October – 28 November 1943 and 15 February – 24 March 1944), and for a brief period (27 June – 1 September 1943) she served as a unit of anti-submarine hunter-killer groups, Task Groups 21.12 and 21.16.

In October 1944, Badger transited the Panama Canal and conducted anti submarine training in the Gulf of Panama off Balboa, Panama Canal Zone. Between 15 November 1944 and 20 June 1945, Badger served with the Anti-Submarine Development Detachment, Port Everglades, Florida, conducting anti-submarine warfare development exercises.

Decommissioning and disposal
Badger arrived at Philadelphia, Pennsylvania, on 22 June 1945 and was decommissioned on 20 July 1945. She was sold on 30 November 1945 for scrapping.

Awards
 American Defense Service Medal
 European–African–Middle Eastern Campaign Medal with one battle star for World War II service
 World War II Victory Medal

Badger received her battle star while operating with Task Group 21.12 in 1943.

Convoys escorted

Sources

External links
NavSource Online:Destroyer Photo Index DD-126 USS BADGER. Verified availability 03-06-2005.

 

Wickes-class destroyers
World War II destroyers of the United States
Ships built by New York Shipbuilding Corporation
1918 ships